Zuliana Alejandra Araya Gutiérrez (born August 13, 1964) is a Chilean politician and transgender rights activist. She has served as a Valparaíso city council, and president of the Afrodita union. She is Chile's first trans city council member.

History 
Araya's political career began in 2001 when she assumed the regional presidency and a founder of the Afrodita union, the first transgender union group in Chile.  

She ran for Valparaíso city council for the first time in 2004. She is a member of the Party for Democracy (PPD). Araya was elected in 2012, for the term period of 2012 to 2016; and then she was elected for a second time in 2016, for the term period 2016 to 2020. 

In July 2012, she legally changed her name to "Zuliana Araya". In December 2019, she was able to have sex reassignment surgery, due to a new .

References

External links 
 

1964 births
Living people
Chilean political people
Transgender politicians
People from Valparaíso
Chilean LGBT rights activists
Party for Democracy (Chile) politicians